Melinda Wrenn Schmidt (born February 18, 1983) is an American actress. She is best known for her starring role as NASA engineer, flight director and later Director of NASA Margo Madison in the Apple TV+ original science fiction space drama series For All Mankind. Other television roles include Julia Sagorsky in the period drama series Boardwalk Empire (2012–2013), as KGB handler Kate in the spy drama series The Americans (2014), as Dr Iris Campbell on the thriller series Person of Interest (2014–2016), as Megan Holter in the horror series Outcast (2016–2018), Her film roles include the horror film Preservation (2014), the biographical drama I Saw the Light (2015), the war film 13 Hours: The Secret Soldiers of Benghazi (2016), the romantic comedy, The Good Catholic (2017) and the science fiction horror film Nope (2022).

Early life and education
Schmidt was born in Lexington, South Carolina. Her father is a biology professor, and her mother is a former dietitian. She comes from mixed European heritage; German from her father, but also English, Scotch-Irish, Polish, and Austrian, among others. She attended the residential high school South Carolina Governor's School for the Arts & Humanities in Greenville, graduating from their inaugural drama class in 2001. She then attended Southern Methodist University's Meadows School of the Arts in University Park, Texas, graduating summa cum laude in 2005 with a B.F.A. in theatre studies and history. She had a part in the George F. Walker play, Heaven, at Dallas' Kitchen Dog Theater in 2003. Schmidt moved to New York City to intern with an off-Broadway theatre company, and worked three jobs as she began auditioning for acting roles.

Career
Schmidt was first cast in Crazy for the Dog in 2006 by the Jean Cocteau Repertory. She served as an understudy in a national tour of Edward Albee's Who's Afraid of Virginia Woolf?, starring Bill Irwin and Kathleen Turner, directed by Anthony Page. The role led to her finding a talent agent, and to her first television appearances on NBC's Law & Order and CBS' 3 lbs in 2006. She appeared in the title role of Sive at the Irish Repertory Theatre in 2007, and was then an understudy in a revival of Come Back, Little Sheba on Broadway. In 2009, Schmidt appeared off-Broadway at the Harold Clurman Theatre as Cleopatra in Caesar and Cleopatra, at the Cherry Lane Theatre in Jailbait, and regionally in Proof at Cape May Stage.

Schmidt made her film debut in the 2010 documentary Client 9: The Rise and Fall of Eliot Spitzer, portraying a prostitute who refused to appear on camera. She had parts that year on NBC's Mercy, and in the play Phantom Killer, about the 1946 Texarkana Moonlight Murders. Schmidt made her feature film debut in Our Idiot Brother, a comedy-drama starring Paul Rudd, Elizabeth Banks, and Zooey Deschanel, which premiered at the 2011 Sundance Film Festival. She was also cast in the play Be a Good Little Widow at Ars Nova, and in Teresa Deevy's Temporal Powers at Manhattan's Mint Theater in 2011. In 2012, Schmidt became a regular on the HBO Prohibition-era crime drama, Boardwalk Empire, playing Julia Sagorsky. She also played Ruth Atkins in the Eugene O’Neill play, Beyond the Horizon, at the Irish Repertory Theatre.

Schmidt returned to the Mint Theater in 2013 to play the title character in Teresa Deevy's Katie Roche, and starred opposite John Turturro as Hilde Wangel in Henrik Ibsen's The Master Builder at the Harvey Theater. She had a number of recurring roles on television in 2014. She played Kate, a KGB handler, on the FX series, The Americans, for six episodes. She also played Jenna Olson on FX's Tyrant, and Dr. Iris Campbell on Person of Interest. Schmidt starred alongside Aaron Staton and Pablo Schreiber in the 2014 horror-thriller film Preservation, which was directed by Christopher Denham and premiered at the Tribeca Film Festival. She then appeared in the 2015 Hank Williams biopic film I Saw the Light, starring Tom Hiddleston and Elizabeth Olsen. She played Bobbie Jett, who had a short-lived relationship with Williams, and gave birth to their daughter, Jett Williams.

In 2016, Schmidt had a role opposite John Krasinski in the Michael Bay film, 13 Hours: The Secret Soldiers of Benghazi, which portrays the 2012 Benghazi attack in Libya. She also joined the cast of the Cinemax drama series, Outcast, based on a Robert Kirkman graphic novel about demonic possession. Schmidt appeared with Danny Glover and John C. McGinley in the independent romantic comedy, The Good Catholic. Schmidt stars in Apple TV+ original series For All Mankind (2019–present), which explores an alternate history where the Soviet Union reaches the moon before the United States, leading to the Space Race continuing far beyond its historical end, playing the central role of NASA engineer Margo Madison.

Filmography

Film

Television

References

External links

 
 

1983 births
Living people
21st-century American actresses
Actresses from South Carolina
Southern Methodist University alumni
People from Lexington, South Carolina